Soboma George (died August 24, 2010) was a militant in both the Movement for the Emancipation of the Niger Delta and The Outlaws. In August 2009  George accepted an amnesty offer made by the Nigerian government, under President Umaru Musa Yar'Adua. George reportedly escaped multiple arrests and assassination attempts  before being killed on August 24, 2010 in Port Harcourt.

Until his death, Soboma led The Outlaws, a cult gang, and was a notorious commander of MEND. In 2007, a joint military operation claimed to have tracked and killed George, but these claims proved to be rumors. George was one of the militant gang leaders to embrace Yar'adua's amnesty in August 2009.

In events leading up to his death, George allegedly ordered Fiofori  and two other men to assassinate Peremobowei Ebebi, former Deputy Governor of Bayelsa. Fiofori and others reportedly killed George instead of Ebebi.  Emmanuel Gladstone and Dobra Ogbe were arrested in connection with George's death .

References 

Year of birth missing
2010 deaths